I ratti della Sabina (the Sabina rats, a pun on il ratto delle Sabine meaning "the Rape of the Sabine Women") were an Italian folk rock band from Rieti. They formed in 1996 and disbanded in 2010. They are indicated as the successors of Modena City Ramblers's combat folk.

Band members
 Carlo Ferretti (born 1979) – drum kit, percussion
 Valerio Manelfi (born 1981) – acoustic bass, electric bass
 Alessandro Monzi (born 1977) – violin, shaker
 Roberto Billi (born 1972) – vocals, acoustic guitar
 Paolo Masci (born 1972) – bouzouki, mandolin-banjo, dobro
 Alberto Ricci (born 1968) – accordion
 Eugenio Lupi (born 1972) – electric guitar
 Stefano Fiori (born 1975) – vocals, acoustic guitar

Discography
 1998 - Acqua e terra
 2001 - Cantiecontrocantincantina
 2003 - Circobirò
 2006 - A passo lento
 2007 - ... sotto il cielo del tendone
 2009 - Va tutto bene

External links
  

Italian musical groups
Musical groups established in 1996